The Summit League women's soccer tournament is the conference championship tournament in women's soccer for the Summit League. The tournament has been held every year since 1999. It is a single-elimination tournament and seeding is based on regular season records. The winner, declared conference champion, receives the conference's automatic bid to the NCAA Division I women's soccer tournament.
Oakland has won the most tournament titles with 8, even though they are no longer a member of the Summit League. The current member with the most tournament titles is South Dakota State with 6. The current champion is Omaha (1).

Champions

Key

Finals

^ - Played in Spring 2021

Source:

Performance by school

''Italics indicate a school that is no longer a member of the Summit League
The 2020 tournament was played in Spring 2021

References

Summit League Women's Soccer Tournament